Klokotnica (Cyrillic: Клокотница) may refer to:

Klokotnica (Doboj Istok), a village in  Bosnia and Herzegovina

See also
Klokotnitsa (disambiguation) (Клокотница)
Klokot (disambiguation)
Klokočevac (disambiguation)